"Like a Sad Song" is a song written and performed by the American singer-songwriter John Denver, released as a single from his 1976 album, Spirit. Although it only reached number 36 on the Billboard Hot 100 singles chart, "Like a Sad Song" became Denver's eighth single to reach number one on the easy listening chart within the span of three years.

Cash Box said that "Denver handles the ballad on acoustic guitar with sensitive string backing."  Record World called it "a soft spoken love song" in which "[Denver's] vocal grabs your attention and holds on until the song's end."

Chart performance

See also
List of number-one adult contemporary singles of 1976 (U.S.)

References

Whitburn, Joel (1996). The Billboard Book of Top 40 Hits, 6th Edition (Billboard Publications)

1976 singles
John Denver songs
Songs written by John Denver
1976 songs
RCA Records singles
Song recordings produced by Milt Okun